Rathwi Bareli is a Bhil language of India, spoken mainly in Gujarat. It is close to two other languages called Bareli, but not mutually intelligible with them. It has 81%–93% lexical similarity with Rathwi Bareli dialects, 67%–73% with Palya Bareli and 68%–79% with Pauri Bareli.

See also 

rathva koli 
koli people
rathwi Bareli
Languages of India
Gujarati language
Gujarati people
Languages with official status in India
List of Indian languages by total speakers
Panchmahal district
Vadodara district

References

Languages of India
Bhil
 Gujarati language